The Taekwondo  Federation of India (TFI) is the national governing body for Taekwondo in India on confirmation from World Taekwondo on 9 July 2019.

Since there were many disputes from almost a decade among the office bearers of the previous governing body (TFI) Indian Olympic Association and Delhi High Court took the matter in its own hands and formed a committee headed by former Supreme Court judge Nageswara Rao to bring relief to the affected Taekwondo athletes of the whole country. This decision of the committee was welcomed and accepted by the IOA dated 14 November 2022.

Jimmy R. Jagtiani was one of the pioneer of taekwondo in India. Jagtiani, who was born in Vietnam in 1955, had emigrated to Lucknow, Uttar Pradesh with his family to escape the Vietnam War. He founded the Taekwondo Federation of India on 2 August 1976, and is regarded as the father of taekwondo in India. The federation marked its first anniversary in 1977 with a demonstration of high power taekwondo techniques at the K.D. Singh Babu Indoor Stadium in Lucknow. The TFI received affiliation from the World Taekwondo Federation (WTF) in 1979, the Asian Taekwondo Union (ATU) in 1982, the Indian Olympic Association (IOA) in 1985, and the South Asian Taekwondo Federation (SATF) in 1994.

Taekwondo was included as a discipline for the first at the 1985 National Games in New Delhi. The TFI organized a special taekwondo demonstration by Korean taekwondokas for then Prime Minister Rajiv Gandhi at the Prime Minister's residence on 17 March 1986. Gandhi was impressed by the demonstration and agreed to "extend all possible help" to the TFI. The Union Ministry of Youth Affairs and Sports officially recognized the TFI as the national governing body for taekwondo in 1988.

The TFI granted affiliation to the Services Sports Control Board in 1990, the Taekwondo Academy of India in 1990, Army Sports Control Board (ASCB) in 1992, and the Central Industrial Security Force (CISF) in 1995. Numerous state/UT taekwondo boards are also affiliated to the TFI.

References

Taekwondo organizations
Sports governing bodies in India
Sports organizations established in 1976
1975 establishments in India
National Taekwondo teams